S. P. Lepcha (15 May 1927 – 12 February 2018) was an  Indian academic and politician from West Bengal belonging to  Communist Party of India (Marxist). He was a member of the Rajya Sabha and Lok Sabha.

Early life
Lepcha was born on 15 May 1927 at Plungdung Basti in Darjeeling to Pusang Lepcha and Dolmi.

Career
Lepcha was a school teacher of Singtam Tea Garden. He was elected as a member of the Rajya Sabha from West Bengal in 1980. Later, he was elected as a member of the Lok Sabha from Darjeeling in 1999.

Personal life
Lepcha was married to Jaisari Lepcha. They had two sons and five daughters.

Death
Lepcha died on 12 February 2018 at a nursing home in Pradhan Nagar of Siliguri at the age of 90.

References

1927 births
2018 deaths
People from Darjeeling district
Indian schoolteachers
Lok Sabha members from West Bengal
Rajya Sabha members from West Bengal
Communist Party of India (Marxist) politicians from West Bengal
India MPs 1999–2004
Indian Gorkhas
Lepcha people